Whyanbeelia is a genus of plants under the family Picrodendraceae described as a genus in 1976.

There is only one known species, Whyanbeelia terrae-reginae, endemic to the Cook region of the Australian State of Queensland. The epithet "terrae-reginae" is Latin for "from the land of the queen."

References

Picrodendraceae
Flora of Queensland
Monotypic Malpighiales genera
Taxa named by Bernard Hyland